The men's decathlon competition at the 2002 European Athletics Championships was held on 7 August and 8 August 2002 in Munich, Germany.

Medalists

Schedule

7 August

8 August

Records

Results

See also
 2001 World Championships in Athletics – Men's decathlon
 2002 Hypo-Meeting
 2002 Decathlon Year Ranking
 2003 World Championships in Athletics – Men's decathlon

References
 Results
 Results

Decathlon
Combined events at the European Athletics Championships